Aparetiti Agapi Mou (Greek: Απαραίτητη Αγάπη Μου) is the title of the first studio album by the popular Greek artist Popi Maliotaki, released in 2005 by Alpha Records (Greek company). This album is the debut album who started her career in music. Shortly after the album release, Maliotaki managed to getting the 13th place in the official music album list in Greece among other 50 seats and catapulted its shares.

Track listing

Trivia
In album, Haris Akritidis sang with Popi Maliotaki the song "My Necessary Love".

Chart performance

References

2005 debut albums
Greek-language albums
Popi Maliotaki albums